Radipole  was a suburb of Weymouth in Dorset, England.

History
It was formerly an independent parish, until abolished as a separate local government unit in 1933. It remains a separate ecclesiastical parish. Radipole stands at the head of, and is named after, the lake, now an RSPB nature reserve, into which the River Wey flows, and which leads into Weymouth Harbour. Until 1984, it had Radipole railway station on the South West Main Line and Heart of Wessex Line out of Weymouth.

There is some evidence of prehistoric occupation, and it is believed that the Romans had a small port or landing stage at the head of the lake. A Romano-British burial site was found nearby when the upper playing field of Southill Primary School was constructed.  A Roman road runs from Radipole to Dorchester (the former Durnovaria), and indeed still forms by far the greater part of the line of the present road between Weymouth and Dorchester.

The parish of Radipole predates by centuries the borough of Melcombe Regis, which grew up on its wastes on an exposed spit of shingle by the sea in the 12th century. The church of St Ann was the mother church of Melcombe Regis until 1606. The church is distinguished for its triple bellcote, consisting of a single arch above double arches. A daughter church, St Aldhelm's, was built in 1939–41.

In the last decades, Radipole has experienced suburbanisation and accompanying road-building, as nearby Weymouth has expanded northwards. However the centre of the old village still remains. The attractive architectural group formed by the church and the manor house is well known locally. The field known as Humpty-Dumpty Field immediately to the south of the churchyard, on the slope leading down to the head of the lake, is supposed once to have covered the site of the lost mediaeval village, and possibly even Roman remains, but any such evidence was destroyed by the action of the then landowner.

Radipole was a part of the district of Weymouth and Portland until the creation of the unitary Dorset Council in 2019.

References

 Dorset (The Buildings of England),  by John Newman and Nikolaus Pevsner. Page 355. Published by Penguin Books 1972. Reprint 1975.

External links

Radipole & Southill Local Community & History

Villages in Dorset
Geography of Weymouth, Dorset
Former civil parishes in Dorset